PCMan File Manager (PCManFM) is a file manager application, developed by Hong Jen Yee from Taiwan, which is meant to be a replacement for GNOME Files, Dolphin and Thunar. PCManFM is the standard file manager in LXDE, also developed by the same author in conjunction with other developers. Since 2010, PCManFM has undergone a complete rewrite from scratch; build instructions, setup and configuration have changed in the process.

Released under the GNU General Public License, PCManFM is free software. It follows the specifications given by Freedesktop.org for interoperability.

He clarified, though, that does not indicate any departure from GTK in LXDE, saying: "The GTK and Qt versions will coexist". The new PCManFM-Qt is a core component of LXQt. In 2020 the Arch Linux community ported PCManFM to GTK 3.

Features 
PCManFM's features include:
 Full GVfs support with seamless access to remote file systems (able to handle sftp://, dav://, smb://, etc. when related back-ends of gvfs are installed.)
 Twin panel
 Thumbnails for pictures
 Desktop management - shows wallpaper and desktop icons
 Bookmarks
 Multilingual
 Tabbed browsing (similar to a web browser)
 Volume management (mount/unmount/eject, requires gvfs)
 Drag & drop support
 Files can be dragged among tabs
 File association (Default application)
 Provides the following views: icon, compact, detailed list, thumbnail, and tree on the left sidebar

See also 

 Comparison of file managers
 LXDE
 LXQt
 Thunar
 SpaceFM

References

External links

 

Free file managers
LXDE
LXQt
Free software programmed in C
Software that uses Qt
File managers that use GTK
Software that was ported from GTK to Qt